The seventh series of the British medical drama television series Holby City commenced airing in the United Kingdom on BBC One on 19 October 2004, and concluded on 11 October 2005.

Cast

Main characters 

Kelly Adams as Mickie Hendrie
Ian Aspinall as Mubbs Hussein (until episode 52)
Adam Best as Matt Parker (from episode 29)

Sharon D. Clarke as Lola Griffin (from episode 34)
Paul Henshall as Dean West (from episode 29)
Tina Hobley as Chrissie Williams
Noah Huntley as Will Curtis (until episode 25)
Jaye Jacobs as Donna Jackson

Verona Joseph as Jess Griffin
Art Malik as Zubin Khan (until episode 51)
Sharon Maughan as Tricia Williams
Amanda Mealing as Connie Beauchamp
Mark Moraghan as Owen Davis
Patricia Potter as Diane Lloyd

Hugh Quarshie as Ric Griffin
Kim Vithana as Rosie Sattar (until episode 13)

Recurring characters 
David Bedella as Carlos Fashola (until episode 35)
Martin Hancock as Reg Lund (from episode 37)
Andrew Lewis as Paul Rose
Alex Macqueen as Keith Greene (from episode 30)
Chinna Wodu as Sean Thompson (episodes 6−43)

Episodes

References

07
2004 British television seasons
2005 British television seasons